Highway to Battle is a 1961 British thriller film set just prior to the Second World War.

Plot
Before the Second World War, a Nazi party member starts to have misgivings about the Nazis' plans. He attempts to defect to England, but is chased by the Gestapo.

Cast
 Gerard Heinz as Constantin
 Margaret Tyzack as Hilda
 Ferdy Mayne as Zeigler
 Dawn Beret as Gerda
 Peter Reynolds as Jarvost
 Vincent Ball as Ransome
 George Mikell as Brauwitz
 John Gabriel as Carl

Rest of cast listed alphabetically
 Robert Bruce as Editor
 Robert Crewdson as Newmens
 Hugh Cross as Official
 Jill Hyem as Stewardess
 Cavan Malone as Hoffman
 Bernadette Milnes as Bar Girl
 Richard Shaw as Franz

References

External links

1960s thriller films
British thriller films
British black-and-white films
1960s English-language films
Films shot at New Elstree Studios
Films directed by Ernest Morris
1960s British films